The Art of Losing is the second studio album by Welsh musician The Anchoress (birth name Catherine Anne Davies). It was released on 12 March 2021 by Kscope. Written and produced by Davies, the record has a dark alt-pop sound. Lyrically, it draws from grief, fury, and Davies's personal experiences. Upon release, the album was met with critical acclaim, with praise towards Davies's storytelling.

Background and release 

The Art of Losing follows Davies's 2020 collaboration project In Memory of My Feelings with Bernard Butler, that was written and recorded over 15 days. It also marks her first full-length release since her 2016 debut album, Confessions of a Romance Novelist. According to Davies, The Art of Losing was inspired by the works of musicians, such as Scott Walker, David Bowie, and the Manic Street Preachers. It was written and produced by Davies, and features a guest appearance by frequent collaborator James Dean Bradfield of Manic Street Preachers. The album derives its title from the opening line of American poet Elizabeth Bishop's poem "One Art" (1976) – "The art of losing isn't hard to master". The album incorporates a dark alt-pop production. The production features pianos, cellos, synthesizers, and drums. Lyrically, the concept album is about the "sensation of loss". It explores themes of grief, fury, trauma, and the singer's personal experiences.

The record was announced in November 2020, alongside the cover-art and track list. The fourth track, "Show Your Face", was simultaneously served as the lead single from the album. In the lead-up to the release of the album, "Unravel" was served as the second single on 4 December 2020, while the title track was delivered as the third single on 22 January 2021. The Art of Losing was released on 12 March 2021 by Kscope.

Critical reception 

At Metacritic, which assigns a weighted average rating out of 100 to reviews from mainstream publications, this release received an average score of 83, based on six reviews, indicating "universal acclaim". 

Writing for The Line of Best Fit, Steven Loftin dubbed the album as "a collection of songs that each sits within the calloused hand of grief, desperately trying to unfurl its infuriatingly homely fingers with an embittered rage". Reviewing for NME, El Hunt lauded Davies's "raw and unfiltered" lyricism and the production. Hunt described the album as both "painful and familiar" and wrote that it "captures the unpredictable, spinning chaos of grief with a searing precision that's hard to turn away from". Similarly, Josh Gray of Clash praised Davies's "authorial voice and ability" to tell an honest story, as well as the album's sound. musicOMHs Steven Murphy felt the album was "a palpable step up for Davies". In FMS Magazine, Jimi Arundell described the "stoic yet stylish" record as "a true masterpiece which transforms her own tragedies into a universal language of pain".

"The Art of Losing" which was named amongst the "Best Albums of 2021" by numerous publications including the Sunday Times, Prog Magazine, Record Collector, The Line of Best Fit, The Sun, Yorkshire Post, and Classic Rock.

Year-end lists

Track listing 
All tracks were written and produced by Davies.

Charts

References 

2021 albums
Kscope albums
The Anchoress (musician) albums